The 2014–15 James Madison Dukes men's basketball team represented James Madison University during the 2014–15 NCAA Division I men's basketball season. The Dukes, led by seventh year head coach Matt Brady, played their home games at the James Madison University Convocation Center and were members of the Colonial Athletic Association. They finished the season 19–14, 12–6 in CAA play to finish in a four way tie for the CAA regular season championship. They lost in the quarterfinals of the CAA tournament to Hofstra. They were invited to the CollegeInsider.com Tournament where they lost in the first round to USC Upstate.

Previous season 
The Dukes finished the season 11–20, 6–10 in CAA play to finish in a tie for sixth place. They lost in the quarterfinals of the CAA tournament to Towson.

Departures

Incoming transfers

Under NCAA transfer rules, Devonte Morgan will have to redshirt for the 2014–15 season. Will have two years of remaining eligibility.

Recruiting

Roster

Schedule

|-
!colspan=9 style="background:#450084; color:#C2A14D;"| Exhibition

|-
!colspan=9 style="background:#450084; color:#C2A14D;"| Regular season

|-
!colspan=9 style="background:#450084; color:#C2A14D;"| CAA tournament

|-
!colspan=9 style="background:#450084; color:#C2A14D;"| CIT

See also
 2014–15 James Madison Dukes women's basketball team

References

James Madison Dukes men's basketball seasons
James Madison
James Madison
James Madison